Yaropolets is a village in Russia's Volokolamsky District in Moscow Oblast. 

While small, the village has several attractions. It is home to both the Goncharov Estate and the Chernyshev Estate, The Church of Our Lady of Kazan, and Russia's first rural hydroelectric power station. Cossack political and military leader, Hetman of Right-bank Ukraine Petro Doroshenko is buried in the village.

References

Rural localities in Moscow Oblast
Volokolamsky District